Bethel Village is a station on Pittsburgh Regional Transit's light rail, located in Bethel Park, Pennsylvania. A street level stop, the station is designed to serve area residents that can walk to the station as well as shoppers who want to access the variety of big box stores located near the station and just to the north of the South Hills Village mall.
The stop featured a turnaround loop for PCC's operating on the 47D Drake service, and was intended for cars operating on shuttle services that terminated at Dorchester.  However, the loop saw very limited usage, as cars were prone to derailing on its tight curve, and was dismantled in 1997.

History 
The station opened as part of a light rail line between South Hills Village and Castle Shannon in 1984 and served both residential and commercial locations.

During the July 2022 emergency closures, in which the entirety of Pittsburgh's Red Line would close, PRT announced that the station would receive more limited service as well as limited delays, as the Blue and Silver lines' inbound tracks would be used for all inbound service.

Location 
The station is sandwiched between the intersection of Avon Lane and Cambridge Road in Bethel Park, and Oxford Drive. The station is the primary light rail access point for one of Giant Eagle's Market District stores serving the South Hills Village, located about 1100 feet away by foot.

The station is also mentioned as a primary access point for Bethel Park's UPMC Field, which is a community baseball diamond used by Bethel Park municipal baseball programs.

References

External links 

Port Authority T Stations Listings
Station from Google Maps Street View

Port Authority of Allegheny County stations
Railway stations in the United States opened in 1984
Blue Line (Pittsburgh)
Red Line (Pittsburgh)